Season of Miracles is a 2013 American Christian-themed drama film directed by Dave Moody and starring John Schneider, Grayson Russell, Andrew Williams, and Nancy Stafford. Based on writer Rusty Whitener's award-winning novel A Season of Miracles, the story is set in Alabama during the 1970s and follows a group of twelve-year-olds and their championship little league baseball season.

The film is the third feature-length movie produced by Elevating Entertainment Motion Pictures in Nashville, TN and is distributed in the US by Gaiam Vivendi Entertainment.

Plot
Season of Miracles chronicles the Robins, an underdog Little League team through their 1974 season with newcomer and autistic baseball savant, Rafer (Grayson Russell). Team leader Zack (Andrew Williams) takes Rafer under his wing despite taunting from their rivals, the Hawks.  Their Coach (John Schneider), manager Rebecca (Sydney Morgan Layne), and the rest of the Robins encourage Rafer as the team rises towards an unlikely championship season.

Season of Miracles is a life-inspiring story about sportsmanship, friendship, and courage in the face of adversity.

Cast
John Schneider as Coach
Grayson Russell as Rafer
Andrew Wilson Williams as Zach
Nancy Stafford as Nurse Barbara
Sydney Morgan Layne as Rebecca
Jacob Armstrong as The Pastor
Jake Studebaker as Little Richard

Reception
Season of Miracles has been praised by family-oriented critics and others for its positive, inspirational message.  Edwin L. Carpenter, reviewing the film for the Dove Foundation, writes:
"Season of Miracles hits a home run and grandly shows that miracles can still happen. John Schneider is terrific as the coach of the team and he encourages the boys that, if they show heart, anything is possible. This movie inspires the viewer to believe!" 

Oren Aviv, President of Walt Disney Studios Motion Picture Productions speaking at the Movieguide awards as he presented Rusty Whitener his Kairos Prize for the film's screenplay called the film "a uniquely compelling drama about a group of twelve year olds and their championship little league baseball season, that is not so much about winning and losing as it is about living and dying."  

Other reviews include the following:

Awards
2013 Official Selection - Dixie Film Festival (Athens, GA) – Season of Miracles
2013 Official Selection - Gideon Film Festival (Orlando, Florida) – Season of Miracles
2010 Kairos Prize presented by Movieguide and the Templeton Foundation – Screenwriter Rusty Whitener

References

External links

 
 

2013 films
2010s sports drama films
American sports drama films
Films about autism
American baseball films
Films shot in Tennessee
2013 drama films
2010s American films